Viewscreen may refer to:

 Display device
 Projection screen
 Flat panel display
 Computer monitor

See also
 Screen (disambiguation)
 Clear view screen, rotating glass disk in windows on ships used to keep weather off it
 Viewport
 Display (disambiguation)